The Krasnogorsk constituency (No.120) is a Russian legislative constituency in Moscow Oblast. The constituency covers northwestern Moscow Oblast.

Members elected

Election results

1993

|-
! colspan=2 style="background-color:#E9E9E9;text-align:left;vertical-align:top;" |Candidate
! style="background-color:#E9E9E9;text-align:left;vertical-align:top;" |Party
! style="background-color:#E9E9E9;text-align:right;" |Votes
! style="background-color:#E9E9E9;text-align:right;" |%
|-
|style="background-color:"|
|align=left|Vladimir Gaboyev
|align=left|Yavlinsky–Boldyrev–Lukin
|
|20.61%
|-
|style="background-color:#78866B"|
|align=left|Viktor Melnikov
|align=left|Dignity and Charity
| -
|17.20%
|-
| colspan="5" style="background-color:#E9E9E9;"|
|- style="font-weight:bold"
| colspan="3" style="text-align:left;" | Total
| 
| 100%
|-
| colspan="5" style="background-color:#E9E9E9;"|
|- style="font-weight:bold"
| colspan="4" |Source:
|
|}

1995

|-
! colspan=2 style="background-color:#E9E9E9;text-align:left;vertical-align:top;" |Candidate
! style="background-color:#E9E9E9;text-align:left;vertical-align:top;" |Party
! style="background-color:#E9E9E9;text-align:right;" |Votes
! style="background-color:#E9E9E9;text-align:right;" |%
|-
|style="background-color:"|
|align=left|Dmitry Krasnikov
|align=left|Communist Party
|
|18.63%
|-
|style="background-color:#CE1100"|
|align=left|Martin Shakkum
|align=left|My Fatherland
|
|11.21%
|-
|style="background-color:"|
|align=left|Sergey Kalashnikov
|align=left|Liberal Democratic Party
|
|8.98%
|-
|style="background-color:"|
|align=left|Yury Levitsky
|align=left|Our Home – Russia
|
|8.71%
|-
|style="background-color:#3A46CE"|
|align=left|Leonid Gozman
|align=left|Democratic Choice of Russia – United Democrats
|
|5.16%
|-
|style="background-color:"|
|align=left|Igor Yakovenko
|align=left|Democratic Alternative
|
|5.13%
|-
|style="background-color:#2C299A"|
|align=left|Mikhail Sinelin
|align=left|Congress of Russian Communities
|
|4.97%
|-
|style="background-color:#F7C451"|
|align=left|Natalya Burmistrova
|align=left|Common Cause
|
|3.35%
|-
|style="background-color:#3C3E42"|
|align=left|Nikolay Laptev
|align=left|Duma-96
|
|2.97%
|-
|style="background-color:#295EC4"|
|align=left|Valery Bakunin
|align=left|Party of Economic Freedom
|
|2.68%
|-
|style="background-color:"|
|align=left|Aleksandr Grebenshchikov
|align=left|Independent
|
|2.47%
|-
|style="background-color:"|
|align=left|Valery Kvartalnov
|align=left|Agrarian Party
|
|2.24%
|-
|style="background-color:"|
|align=left|Vladimir Gaboyev (incumbent)
|align=left|Independent
|
|1.96%
|-
|style="background-color:#F21A29"|
|align=left|Vladimir Davidenko
|align=left|Trade Unions and Industrialists – Union of Labour
|
|1.82%
|-
|style="background-color:"|
|align=left|Aleksandr Lyasko
|align=left|Independent
|
|1.53%
|-
|style="background-color:"|
|align=left|Sergey Malinin
|align=left|Independent
|
|0.79%
|-
|style="background-color:"|
|align=left|Yury Livin
|align=left|Union of Patriots
|
|0.76%
|-
|style="background-color:#019CDC"|
|align=left|Stanislav Kolonyuk
|align=left|Party of Russian Unity and Accord
|
|0.55%
|-
|style="background-color:#5A5A58"|
|align=left|Aleksey Lintsov
|align=left|Federal Democratic Movement
|
|0.38%
|-
|style="background-color:#00A44E"|
|align=left|Mikhail Khoruzhik
|align=left|Bloc '89
|
|0.33%
|-
|style="background-color:#0D0900"|
|align=left|Lev Kononykhin
|align=left|People's Union
|
|0.17%
|-
|style="background-color:#000000"|
|colspan=2 |against all
|
|12.19%
|-
| colspan="5" style="background-color:#E9E9E9;"|
|- style="font-weight:bold"
| colspan="3" style="text-align:left;" | Total
| 
| 100%
|-
| colspan="5" style="background-color:#E9E9E9;"|
|- style="font-weight:bold"
| colspan="4" |Source:
|
|}

1999

|-
! colspan=2 style="background-color:#E9E9E9;text-align:left;vertical-align:top;" |Candidate
! style="background-color:#E9E9E9;text-align:left;vertical-align:top;" |Party
! style="background-color:#E9E9E9;text-align:right;" |Votes
! style="background-color:#E9E9E9;text-align:right;" |%
|-
|style="background-color:#3B9EDF"|
|align=left|Martin Shakkum
|align=left|Fatherland – All Russia
|
|33.26%
|-
|style="background-color:"|
|align=left|Roman Popkovich
|align=left|Our Home – Russia
|
|9.99%
|-
|style="background-color:"|
|align=left|Yury Shchekochikhin
|align=left|Yabloko
|
|9.96%
|-
|style="background-color:"|
|align=left|Dmitry Krasnikov (incumbent)
|align=left|Independent
|
|7.48%
|-
|style="background-color:"|
|align=left|Valery Kvartalnov
|align=left|Independent
|
|6.56%
|-
|style="background-color:"|
|align=left|Mikhail Nenashev
|align=left|Independent
|
|4.14%
|-
|style="background-color:"|
|align=left|Anatoly Alekseyev
|align=left|Independent
|
|3.42%
|-
|style="background-color:"|
|align=left|Marina Mogilevskaya
|align=left|Independent
|
|2.07%
|-
|style="background-color:"|
|align=left|Yury Smirnov
|align=left|Independent
|
|1.87%
|-
|style="background-color:"|
|align=left|Mikhail Bondarenko
|align=left|Independent
|
|1.82%
|-
|style="background-color:"|
|align=left|Sergey Artamonov
|align=left|Liberal Democratic Party
|
|1.68%
|-
|style="background-color:#000000"|
|colspan=2 |against all
|
|14.82%
|-
| colspan="5" style="background-color:#E9E9E9;"|
|- style="font-weight:bold"
| colspan="3" style="text-align:left;" | Total
| 
| 100%
|-
| colspan="5" style="background-color:#E9E9E9;"|
|- style="font-weight:bold"
| colspan="4" |Source:
|
|}

2003

|-
! colspan=2 style="background-color:#E9E9E9;text-align:left;vertical-align:top;" |Candidate
! style="background-color:#E9E9E9;text-align:left;vertical-align:top;" |Party
! style="background-color:#E9E9E9;text-align:right;" |Votes
! style="background-color:#E9E9E9;text-align:right;" |%
|-
|style="background-color:"|
|align=left|Martin Shakkum (incumbent)
|align=left|United Russia
|
|38.84%
|-
|style="background-color:"|
|align=left|Yury Korablin
|align=left|Independent
|
|18.43%
|-
|style="background-color:"|
|align=left|Valery Bakunin
|align=left|Yabloko
|
|7.37%
|-
|style="background-color:"|
|align=left|Valery Sharnin
|align=left|Communist Party
|
|5.77%
|-
|style="background-color:"|
|align=left|Aleksandr Grebenshchikov
|align=left|Agrarian Party
|
|2.92%
|-
|style="background-color:"|
|align=left|Tatyana Khakhalina
|align=left|Independent
|
|2.18%
|-
|style="background-color:"|
|align=left|Nikolay Neverov
|align=left|Independent
|
|2.11%
|-
|style="background-color:#00A1FF"|
|align=left|Boris Pavlov
|align=left|Party of Russia's Rebirth-Russian Party of Life
|
|1.74%
|-
|style="background-color:#7C73CC"|
|align=left|Leonid Borisenko
|align=left|Great Russia – Eurasian Union
|
|0.76%
|-
|style="background-color:#000000"|
|colspan=2 |against all
|
|17.30%
|-
| colspan="5" style="background-color:#E9E9E9;"|
|- style="font-weight:bold"
| colspan="3" style="text-align:left;" | Total
| 
| 100%
|-
| colspan="5" style="background-color:#E9E9E9;"|
|- style="font-weight:bold"
| colspan="4" |Source:
|
|}

2016

|-
! colspan=2 style="background-color:#E9E9E9;text-align:left;vertical-align:top;" |Candidate
! style="background-color:#E9E9E9;text-align:left;vertical-align:top;" |Party
! style="background-color:#E9E9E9;text-align:right;" |Votes
! style="background-color:#E9E9E9;text-align:right;" |%
|-
|style="background-color: " |
|align=left|Martin Shakkum
|align=left|United Russia
|
|38.38%
|-
|style="background-color:"|
|align=left|Aleksey Russkikh
|align=left|Communist Party
|
|15.04%
|-
|style="background-color:"|
|align=left|Vasily Kharpak
|align=left|Liberal Democratic Party
|
|11.88%
|-
|style="background-color:"|
|align=left|Igor Zaytsev
|align=left|Yabloko
|
|6.04%
|-
|style="background-color:"|
|align=left|Aleksandr Romanovich
|align=left|A Just Russia
|
|4.70%
|-
|style="background-color:"|
|align=left|Yelena Grishina
|align=left|The Greens
|
|4.53%
|-
|style="background:"| 
|align=left|Nikolay Mechtanov
|align=left|Communists of Russia
|
|4.26%
|-
|style="background-color:"|
|align=left|Yevgeny Ivanov
|align=left|Rodina
|
|3.94%
|-
|style="background:"| 
|align=left|Konstantin Klimenko
|align=left|Party of Growth
|
|3.24%
|-
|style="background:"| 
|align=left|Vadim Kholostov
|align=left|Patriots of Russia
|
|2.69%
|-
| colspan="5" style="background-color:#E9E9E9;"|
|- style="font-weight:bold"
| colspan="3" style="text-align:left;" | Total
| 
| 100%
|-
| colspan="5" style="background-color:#E9E9E9;"|
|- style="font-weight:bold"
| colspan="4" |Source:
|
|}

2021

|-
! colspan=2 style="background-color:#E9E9E9;text-align:left;vertical-align:top;" |Candidate
! style="background-color:#E9E9E9;text-align:left;vertical-align:top;" |Party
! style="background-color:#E9E9E9;text-align:right;" |Votes
! style="background-color:#E9E9E9;text-align:right;" |%
|-
|style="background-color:"|
|align=left|Sergey Kolunov
|align=left|United Russia
|
|48.24%
|-
|style="background-color:"|
|align=left|Gleb Pyanykh
|align=left|A Just Russia — For Truth
|
|11.76%
|-
|style="background-color:"|
|align=left|Konstantin Cheremisov
|align=left|Communist Party
|
|9.28%
|-
|style="background-color:"|
|align=left|Mikhail Borushkov
|align=left|Liberal Democratic Party
|
|5.97%
|-
|style="background:"| 
|align=left|Vladimir Ryazanov
|align=left|Communists of Russia
|
|5.09%
|-
|style="background-color: " |
|align=left|Yevgeny Yelagin
|align=left|New People
|
|4.69%
|-
|style="background-color: "|
|align=left|Maria Kozlovskaya
|align=left|Party of Pensioners
|
|4.55%
|-
|style="background-color:"|
|align=left|Vera Kozyreva
|align=left|The Greens
|
|2.46%
|-
|style="background: "| 
|align=left|Andrey Aleshkin
|align=left|Yabloko
|
|1.97%
|-
|style="background-color:"|
|align=left|Inna Rodina
|align=left|Rodina
|
|1.93%
|-
| colspan="5" style="background-color:#E9E9E9;"|
|- style="font-weight:bold"
| colspan="3" style="text-align:left;" | Total
| 
| 100%
|-
| colspan="5" style="background-color:#E9E9E9;"|
|- style="font-weight:bold"
| colspan="4" |Source:
|
|}

Notes

References

Russian legislative constituencies
Politics of Moscow Oblast